Wan Mohamed bin Wan Teh was the 7th Menteri Besar of Perak from 1 October 1977 to 1 March 1983. He was also the Member of Perak State Legislative Assembly for Grik from 1969 to 1974, Temengor from 1974 to 1978 and Kenering from 1978 to 1983.

Personal life 
Wan Mohammed was born to Haji Wan Teh and Hajah Kalsom in 1929 at Kampung Ulu Kenderong, Gerik, Perak. His brother Wan Hashim Wan Teh was the Member of Parliament for Gerik from 2004 to 2008

Politics 
When Wan Mohammed was 17 years old, he had joined some assemblies of Malayan Union in Kuala Kangsar. He joined UMNO in 1951 and joined the Kuala Kangsar branch. Wan Mohammed was chosen as the candidate to participate in the 1969 Malaysian general election for the Grik state seat. He won the seat and was unopposed in the 1974 Malaysian general election. He was chosen as an EXCO after that.

In 1977, Ghazali Jawi resigned from the post of Menteri Besar of Perak on the advice of Hussein Onn, President of Barisan Nasional and Prime Minister of Malaysia. Wan Mohamed was subsequently appointed as the Menteri Besar of Perak to replace Ghazali Jawi. His first mission was to fix the relationship between UMNO and the royal family, if not many problems cannot be solved as the Sultan has controls over Islamic issues and the land in Perak.

There are a few people from Orang-Orang Besar Perak had influenced Sultan Idris Shah that Wan Mohammed was a descent of Pattani. Not long after that, he was forced to quit as the Menteri Besar of Perak.

Health 
Wan Mohammed died of lung cancer on 25 August 1993 in his own house.

References 

Malaysian Muslims
People from Perak
United Malays National Organisation politicians
Members of the Perak State Legislative Assembly
Malaysian people of Malay descent
1929 births
1993 deaths